Hydrelia sublatsaria is a moth in the family Geometridae first described by Wehrli in 1938. It is found in China.

References

Moths described in 1938
Asthenini
Moths of Asia